This is the structure of the Canadian Army, as of August 2022.

2nd Canadian Division
Headquarters, 2nd Canadian Division, at CFB Montreal
4 Intelligence Company at CFB Montreal
2nd Canadian Division Training Centre, at CFB Valcartier
2nd Canadian Ranger Patrol Group, at Saint-Jean Garrison

5 Canadian Mechanized Brigade Group

34 Canadian Brigade Group

35 Canadian Brigade Group
{| style="background:none; vertical-align:top"
|- 
|style="vertical-align:top;line-height: 5px"|
| Headquarters, 35 Canadian Brigade Group, at Citadelle of Quebec
|- 
|style="vertical-align:top;line-height: 5px"|
| The Sherbrooke Hussars, at William Street Armoury, Sherbrooke
|- 
|style="vertical-align:top;line-height: 5px"|
| ''12e Régiment blindé du Canada (Militia), at Général-Jean-Victor-Allard Armoury, Trois-Rivières
|- 
|style="vertical-align:top;line-height: 5px"|
| Les Voltigeurs de Québec, at Voltigeurs de Québec Armoury, Quebec City
|- 
|style="vertical-align:top;line-height: 5px"|
| Les Fusiliers du St-Laurent, at Rimouski Armoury, Rimouski
|- 
|style="vertical-align:top;line-height: 5px"|
| Le Régiment de la Chaudière, at Lévis Armoury, Lévis
|- 
|style="vertical-align:top;line-height: 5px"|
| Le Régiment du Saguenay, at Saguenay Armoury, Saguenay
|- 
|style="vertical-align:top;line-height: 5px"|
| Les Fusiliers de Sherbrooke, at Colonel Gaétan Côté Armoury, Sherbrooke
|- 
|style="vertical-align:top;line-height: 5px"|
| 6th Field Artillery Regiment, Royal Canadian Artillery, at Lévis Armoury, Lévis
|- 
|style="vertical-align:top;line-height: 5px"|
| 62nd Field Artillery Regiment, Royal Canadian Artillery, at Gérard F. Dufresne Armoury, Shawinigan
|- 
|style="vertical-align:top;line-height: 5px"|
| 35 Combat Engineer Regiment, Royal Canadian Engineers, at Sainte-Foy Armoury, Quebec
|- 
|style="vertical-align:top;line-height: 5px"|
| 35 Signal Regiment, Royal Canadian Signals, at Beauport Armoury, Quebec City
|- 
|style="vertical-align:top;line-height: 5px"|
| 35 Service Battalion, at St-Malo Military Complex, Quebec City
|}2nd Canadian Division Support GroupHeadquarters, 2nd Canadian Division Support Group, at CFB Montreal
2nd Canadian Division Support Base Valcartier, at CFB Valcartier
La Musique du Royal 22e Régiment, at CFB Valcartier

3rd Canadian Division
Headquarters, 3rd Canadian Division, at CFB Edmonton
6 Intelligence Company, at Brigadier James Curry Jefferson Armoury, Edmonton
3rd Canadian Division Training Centre, at CFB Wainwright
1st Canadian Ranger Patrol Group, at CFNA HQ Yellowknife
4th Canadian Ranger Patrol Group, at CFB Albert Head1 Canadian Mechanized Brigade Group38 Canadian Brigade Group39 Canadian Brigade Group41 Canadian Brigade Group3rd Canadian Division Support GroupHeadquarters, 3rd Canadian Division Support Group, at CFB Edmonton
3rd Canadian Division Support Base Edmonton, at CFB Edmonton
3rd Canadian Division Support Base Edmonton, Wainwright Detachment, at CFB Wainwright
3rd Canadian Division Support Base Shilo, at CFB Shilo
3rd Canadian Division Support Base Suffield, at CFB Suffield

4th Canadian Division
Headquarters, 4th Canadian Division, at Lieutenant Colonel George Taylor Denison III Armoury, Toronto
2 Intelligence Company, at Lieutenant Colonel George Taylor Denison III Armoury, Toronto
Ceremonial Guard, at Ottawa
4th Canadian Division Training Centre, at Meaford
4th Canadian Division Support Base Kingston, at CFB Kingston
3rd Canadian Ranger Patrol Group, at CFB Borden2 Canadian Mechanized Brigade Group31 Canadian Brigade Group32 Canadian Brigade Group33 Canadian Brigade Group4th Canadian Division Support GroupHeadquarters, 4th Canadian Division Support Group, at CFB Petawawa
4 Canadian Division Support Group Signal Squadron
4th Canadian Division Support Base Petawawa, at CFB Petawawa
Area Support Unit Toronto

5th Canadian Division

Canadian Army Doctrine and Training Centre

Headquarters, Canadian Army Doctrine and Training Centre, at CFB Kingston
Canadian Army Command and Staff College, at Fort Frontenac
Canadian Manoeuvre Training Centre, at CFB Wainwright
Army Doctrine Centre, at CFB Kingston
Canadian Army Simulation Centre, at CFB Kingston
Canadian Army Lessons Learned Centre, at CFB Kingston
Peace Support Training Centre, at CFB Kingston
Canadian Armed Forces Arctic Training Centre, at Resolute BayCombat Training Centre'''
Headquarters, Combat Training Centre, at CFB Gagetown
Royal Canadian Armoured Corps School, at CFB Gagetown
Royal Regiment of Canadian Artillery School, at CFB Gagetown
Royal Canadian School of Infantry, at CFB Gagetown
Canadian Forces School of Military Engineering, at CFB Gagetown
Canadian Forces School of Communications and Electronics, at CFB Kingston
Royal Canadian Electrical and Mechanical Engineers School, at CFB Borden
Canadian Army Tactics School, at CFB Gagetown
Canadian Army Advanced Warfare Centre, at CFB Trenton
Canadian Army Trials and Evaluations Unit, at CFB Gagetown
Canadian Army Learning Support Centre, at CFB Gagetown

References

Canadian Army
Military units and formations of the Canadian Army
Canadian Army